Tampureh-ye Ruisheyd (also Romanized as Tampūreh-ye Rūīsheyd; also known as Dambar Rū’shīd and Tambūdorūsheyd) is a village in Mosharrahat Rural District, in the Central District of Ahvaz County, Khuzestan Province, Iran. At the 2006 census, its population was 21, in 4 families.

References 

Populated places in Ahvaz County